Jack Price (birth unknown – death unknown) was an English professional rugby league footballer who played in the 1920s.

Playing career

International honours
Jack Price won caps for England while at Broughton Rangers in 1921 against Australia, while at Wigan in 1922 against Wales, in 1924 against Other Nationalities, and won caps for Great Britain while at Broughton Rangers in 1921–22 against Australia (2 matches), and while at Wigan in 1924 against Australia (2 matches), and New Zealand (2 matches).

Championship final appearances
Jack Price played , in Wigan's 22–10 victory over Warrington in the Championship Final during the 1925–26 season at Knowsley Road, St. Helens on Saturday 8 May 1926.

County League appearances
Jack Price played in Wigan's victories in the Lancashire County League during the 1922–23 season, 1923–24 season and 1925–26 season.

Challenge Cup Final appearances
Jack Price played , and scored a try in Wigan's 21–4 victory over Oldham in the 1923–24 Challenge Cup Final during the 1923–24 season at Athletic Grounds, Rochdale on Saturday 12 April 1924.

County Cup Final appearances
Jack Price played  in Wigan's 11–15 defeat by Swinton in the 1925–26 Lancashire County Cup Final during the 1925–26 season at The Cliff, Broughton on Wednesday 9 December 1925.

References

External links
Statistics at wigan.rlfans.com

Broughton Rangers players
England national rugby league team players
English rugby league players
Great Britain national rugby league team players
Place of birth missing
Place of death missing
Rugby league locks
Rugby league second-rows
Wigan Warriors players
Year of birth missing
Year of death missing